The Men's 5000m athletics events for the 2012 Summer Paralympics took place at the London Olympic Stadium from 31 August to 7 September. A total of three events were contested over this distance for three different classifications.

Schedule

Results

T11

 
Top five finishers:

T12

 
Top five finishers:

T54

 

 
Final

Top five finishers:

References

Athletics at the 2012 Summer Paralympics
2012 in men's athletics